Chauvetia is a genus of sea snails, marine gastropod mollusks in the family Buccinidae, the true whelks.

Species
Species within the genus Chauvetia include:
 Chauvetia affinis (Monterosato, 1889)
 Chauvetia austera Oliver & Rolán, 2009
 Chauvetia balgimae Gofas & Oliver, 2010
 Chauvetia bartolomeoi Ardovini, 2008
 Chauvetia borgesi Oliver & Rolán, 2009
 Chauvetia brunnea (Donovan, 1804)
 Chauvetia candidissima (Philippi, 1836)
 Chauvetia crassior (Odhner, 1932)
 Chauvetia decorata Monterosato, 1889
 Chauvetia dentifera Gofas & Oliver, 2010
 Chauvetia distans Oliver & Rolán, 2009
 Chauvetia edentula Oliver & Rolán, 2009
 Chauvetia errata Oliver & Rolán, 2009
 Chauvetia gigantea Oliver & Rolan, 2008
 Chauvetia gigantissina Oliver & Rolán, 2009
 Chauvetia giunchiorum (Micali, 1999)
 Chauvetia hernandezi Oliver & Rolán, 2009
 † Chauvetia inopinata Landau, C. M. Silva & Vermeij, 2015 
 Chauvetia joani Oliver & Rolan, 2008
 Chauvetia lamyi Knudsen, 1956
 Chauvetia lefebvrii (Maravigna, 1840)
 Chauvetia lineolata (Tiberi, 1868)
 Chauvetia luciacuestae Oliver & Rolan, 2008
 Chauvetia mamillata (Risso, 1826)
 Chauvetia maroccana Gofas & Oliver, 2010
 Chauvetia mauritania Hoffman, Fraussen & Freiwald, 2018
 Chauvetia megastoma Oliver & Rolán, 2009
 Chauvetia merianae Hoffman, Fraussen & Freiwald, 2018
 Chauvetia multilirata Oliver & Rolan, 2008
 Chauvetia obliqua Nordsieck & Talavera, 1979: (nomen dubium)
 Chauvetia pardacuta Oliver & Rolan, 2008
 Chauvetia pardofasciata Oliver & Rolan, 2008
 Chauvetia peculiaris Oliver & Rolán, 2009
 Chauvetia pelorcei Oliver & Rolan, 2008
 Chauvetia poseidonae Hoffman, Fraussen & Freiwald, 2018
 Chauvetia procerula Monterosato, 1889
 Chauvetia recondita (Brugnone, 1873)
 Chauvetia retifera (Brugnone, 1880)
 Chauvetia robustalba Oliver & Rolan, 2008
 Chauvetia soni (Bruguière, 1789)
 Chauvetia taeniata Gofas & Oliver, 2010
 Chauvetia tenebrosa Oliver & Rolan, 2008
 Chauvetia tenuisculpta (Dautzenberg, 1891)
 † Chauvetia  turqueti (C. Vélain, 1876)
 Chauvetia turritellata (Deshayes, 1835)
 Chauvetia ventrosa Nordsieck, 1976
Species brought into synonymy
 Chauvetia javieri Oliver & Rolan, 2008: synonym of Chauvetia bartolomeoi
 Chauvetia lefebvrei (Maravigna, 1840): synonym of Chauvetia lefebvrii (Maravigna, 1840) (misspelling)
 Chauvetia minima (Montagu, 1803): synonym of Chauvetia brunnea (Donovan, 1804)
 Chauvetia pellisphocae (Reeve, 1845) sensu Pallary, 1920: synonym of Chauvetia retifera (Brugnone, 1880) † (misidentification by Pallary (1920) and other European authors)
 Chauvetia submamillata (Bucquoy, Dautzenberg & Dollfus, 1882): synonym of Chauvetia mamillata
 Chauvetia vulpecula (Monterosato, 1874): synonym of Chauvetia recondita (Brugnone, 1873)

References

 Oliver J.D. & Rolan E. 2008. Las especies del género Chauvetia (Gastropoda, Neogastropoda) del área de Dakar, Senegal, África occidental, con la descripción de diez especies nuevas. Iberus 26(2) : 133-175
 Oliver, J. D.; Rolán, E. (2009). Las especies de Chauvetia Monterosato, 1884 (Mollusca, Neogastropoda) de Canarias y el área oeste africana de Mauritania y Sahara. Iberus. 27(2): 113-154
 Gofas S. & Oliver J.D., 2010. Las especies del género Chauvetia (Gastropoda, Neogastropoda, Buccinidae) del área ibero-marroquí, con descripción de cuatro especies nuevas. Iberus 28(1): 23-60
 Gofas, S. & Oliver, J.D., 2010. The species of the genus Chauvetia (Gastropoda, Neogastropoda, Buccinidae) in the Ibero-moroccan area, with the description of four new species. Iberus 28(1): 23-60

External links
 Monterosato T. A. (di) (1884). Nomenclatura generica e specifica di alcune conchiglie mediterranee. Palermo, Virzi, 152 pp
 Risso, A. (1826-1827). Histoire naturelle des principales productions de l'Europe Méridionale et particulièrement de celles des environs de Nice et des Alpes Maritimes. Paris, Levrault:. . 3(XVI): 1-480, 14 pls
 Bucquoy E., Dautzenberg P. & Dollfus G. (1882-1886). Les mollusques marins du Roussillon. Tome Ier. Gastropodes. Paris: Baillière & fils. 570 pp., 66 pls. [pp. 1-84, pls 1-10, 1882; pp. 85-196, pls 11-20, 1883; pp. 197-342, pls 21-40, 1884; pp. 343-418, pls 41-50, 1885; pp. 419-570, pls 51-66
 Iredale, T. (1918). Molluscan nomenclatural problems and solutions.- No. 1. Proceedings of the Malacological Society of London. 13(1-2): 28-40
 Pallary, P. (1902). Liste des mollusques testacés de la baie de Tanger. Journal de Conchyliologie. 50: 1-39, pl. 1
 Micali P. (1999). Note sulle specie di Chauvetia dell'Atlantico nord-orientale. Bollettino Malacologico 34(5-8): 53-68,

Buccinidae
Gastropod genera